Nick Marshall (28 November 1875 – 12 August 1948) was an  Australian rules footballer who played with Geelong in the Victorian Football League (VFL).

Notes

External links 

1875 births
1948 deaths
VFL/AFL players born in England
Australian rules footballers from Victoria (Australia)
Geelong Football Club players
English emigrants to colonial Australia
Australian people of Cornish descent